G2/M phase-specific E3 ubiquitin-protein ligase is an enzyme that in humans is encoded by the G2E3 gene.

References

Further reading